Node-RED is a flow-based development tool for visual programming developed originally by IBM for wiring together hardware devices, APIs and online services as part of the Internet of Things.

Node-RED provides a web browser-based flow editor, which can be used to create JavaScript functions. Elements of applications can be saved or shared for re-use. The runtime is built on Node.js. The flows created in Node-RED are stored using JSON. Since version 0.14, MQTT nodes can make properly configured TLS connections.

In 2016, IBM contributed Node-RED as an open source OpenJS Foundation project.

Node-RED projects

See also

Dataflow programming
Visual programming language
Yahoo! Pipes

References

External links 

Internet of things
JSON
Visual programming languages
IBM software